Andrés Blanco is an activist in the Socialist Workers' Party (Argentina).

He was elected as a provincial deputy in Neuquén Province in 2019.

He has been involved in the FaSinPat factory occupation, and is assistant secretary of the ceramics workers' union in Neuquén.

Sources
Two Socialists Elected In Neuquén Province, Argentina

Living people
Socialist Workers' Party (Argentina) politicians
People from Neuquén Province
Argentine trade unionists
Year of birth missing (living people)
Place of birth missing (living people)